Several different minor league baseball teams have called the city of Orlando, Florida home from 1919–2003. Most have played in the Florida State League.

The original Orlando franchise played between 1919 and 1924 and was alternately called the Caps, Tigers and Bulldogs. The Orlando Colts played between 1926 and 1928.

The Orlando Gulls began in 1937 but changed their name the following year to the Orlando Senators when they became an affiliate of the Washington Senators. The Senators remained through 1955 (though the team name and league was shut down from 1943–1945 during World War II and the name was changed to the Orlando C.B.s for 1954–1955). They won the FSL championship in 1940, 1946 and 1955

In 1956, they were an affiliate of the Diablos Rojos del Mexico of the Mexican League and were known as the Orlando Seratomas. As an affiliate of the Detroit Tigers they were the Orlando Flyers in 1957, a name that remained in 1958 when they were affiliated with the International League team, the Toronto Maple Leafs. They were a Los Angeles Dodgers affiliate known as the Orlando Dodgers from 1959–1961 when this version of the team was discontinued.

The last incarnation of the franchise began in 1963, when the Minnesota Twins (the former Senators) set up a new affiliate called the Orlando Twins. The franchise moved up to the Double-A Southern League in 1973. The  Twins played at Tinker Field in downtown Orlando, near the Florida Citrus Bowl Stadium. In 1990, the team was renamed the Orlando Sun Rays. In 1993, the Chicago Cubs became the team's new major-league affiliate, and the team was renamed the Orlando Cubs. While still a Chicago Cubs affiliate, the team renamed itself once again in 1997 and became the Orlando Rays. The following year, for one season only, the Seattle Mariners were the Rays' major-league affiliate. The Tampa Bay Rays (then the Devil Rays), an American League expansion team in 1998, assumed the Orlando Rays' major-league affiliation the following year.

The Orlando Rays' last season at Tinker Field was 1999. From 2000 to 2003, the Orlando Rays played in Kissimmee, Florida, in Champion Stadium at Walt Disney World Resort.  Despite the fact that the team played in a state-of-the-art stadium that was built in 1997 and used during spring training by the Atlanta Braves, attendance did not meet expectations; after trailing the Southern League in attendance in multiple years, the Rays' owners announced the team would move to Montgomery, Alabama in 2004 (terminating their 10-year lease with Disney after four seasons). Rays players who went on to the major-league level include Carl Crawford, Toby Hall, Trevor Enders, Jorge Cantú, Dewon Brazelton, Chad Gaudin, Matt Diaz, Jonny Gomes, and Seth McClung. The team is now known as the Montgomery Biscuits.

The Gulf Coast Braves also previously played in Orlando.

On June 17, 2016 as part of a charity appeal following the Orlando nightclub shooting, the Tampa Bay Rays wore Orlando Rays caps during their game against the San Francisco Giants. The team also wore Orlando Rays caps in a spring training game on February 28, 2023, while playing home games at the Disney World's ESPN Wide World of Sports.

Notable Orlando alumni

Baseball Hall of Fame alumni
 Bert Blyleven (1969) Inducted, 2011
 Rod Carew (1965) Inducted, 1991
 Ryne Sandberg (1993) Inducted, 2005
 Joe Tinker (1921) Inducted, 1946
 Early Wynn (1972, MGR) Inducted, 1972

Notable Orlando alumni

 Paul Abbott (1989)
 Jack Billingham (1961) MLB All-Star
 Lyman Bostock (1973) Died: Age 27
 Steve Brye (1968)
 Randy Bush (1979-1981)
 John Castino (1977-1978) 1979 Al Rookie of the Year
 Choo-Choo Coleman (1955-1956, 1958-1959)
 Carl Crawford (2001) 4 x MLB All-Star
 Trevor Enders (2000)
 Gary Gaetti 2 x MLB All-Star
 Greg Gagne (1982)
 Ron Gardenhire (1989-1990, MGR) 2010 AL Manager of the Year
 Dave Goltz (1971)
 Jonny Gomes (2003)
 Mark Guthrie (1989)
 Tom Hall (1966)
 Josh Hamilton (2001) 5 x MLB All-Star;2010 AL Batting Title;  2010 AL Most Valuable Player
 Jose Hernandez (1993) MLB All-Star
 Aubrey Huff (1999)
 Tom Kelly (1982, MGR) 1991 AL Manager of the Year; Manager: 2 x World Series Champion - Minnesota Twins (1987, 1991)
 Chuck Knoblauch (1990) 4 x MLB All-Star; 1991 AL Rookie of the Year
 Tim Laudner (1979-1980) MLB All-Star
 Charlie Manuel (1964-1965)(1984-1985, MGR) Manager: 2008 World Series Champion - Philadelphia Phillies
 Jim Morris (1999) Subject: Movie, The Rookie
 Mike Morgan (1995) MLB All-Star
 Denny Neagle (1990) 2 x MLB All-Star
 Joel Piniero (1998)
 Mark Portugal (1984)
 Sherry Robertson (1939)
 Phil Roof (1983,1992, MGR)
 Eric Soderholm (1968-1970)
 Paul Sorrento (1989)
 Dean Stone (1949-1950) MLB All-Star
 Tim Teufel (1980-1982)
 Frank Viola (1981) 3 x MLB All-Star; 1987 World Series Most Valuable Player; 1988 AL Cy Young Award
 Gary Ward (1976) 2 x MLB All-Star
 Rob Wilfong (1974-1975)
 Kerry Wood (1997) 2 x MLB All-Star; 1998 NL Rookie of the Year
 Taffy Wright (1956)

References

External links
Baseball Reference

Defunct minor league baseball teams
Sports competitions in Orlando, Florida
Defunct baseball teams in Florida
Tampa Bay Devil Rays minor league affiliates
Seattle Mariners minor league affiliates
Los Angeles Dodgers minor league affiliates
Minnesota Twins minor league affiliates
Washington Senators minor league affiliates
Chicago Cubs minor league affiliates
Detroit Tigers minor league affiliates
Defunct Florida State League teams
1919 establishments in Florida
2003 disestablishments in Florida
Baseball teams established in 1919
Baseball teams disestablished in 2003